Ross Giudice (1924 – July 14, 2017) was an American college basketball coach at the University of San Francisco (USF). He is best remembered as the assistant coach for the Dons' 1955 and 1956 NCAA championship teams.

Giudice was born in Detroit and moved to San Francisco as a child. After graduating from George Washington High School, he joined the United States Navy and fought in World War II on the USS California.
 Following his time in the service, he enrolled at USF and was a member of the school's basketball team. He played for the Dons from 1945 to 1950 and was a member of the school's 1949 National Invitation Tournament championship team, sinking a crucial free throw to clinch the title.

When Phil Woolpert was hired as head coach at USF in 1950, Giudice was named his lone assistant and coach of the freshman team. In this capacity, Giudice was responsible for developing incoming freshmen and preparing them for the varsity team the following year. Two of Giudice's notable pupils we future Hall of Fame players K. C. Jones and Bill Russell. These two players served as the foundation for USF's two national championship teams. Years later, Russell would credit Giudice with playing a crucial role in his development as a player.

When Woolpert resigned in 1959, Giudice took over as head coach of the Dons. However, he was not interested in the head job and after one season he left coaching for good to go into the furniture business.

Giudice died on July 14, 2017 at an assisted-living facility in Sonoma County, California.

Head coaching record

References

External links
Coaching record

1924 births
2017 deaths
American men's basketball players
Basketball coaches from Michigan
Basketball players from Michigan
College men's basketball head coaches in the United States
San Francisco Dons men's basketball coaches
San Francisco Dons men's basketball players
Sportspeople from Detroit
Shooting guards
Small forwards
United States Navy personnel of World War II
Basketball players from Detroit